Islambek Orozbekov is a Kyrgyzstani freestyle wrestler. He is a three-time bronze medalist at the Asian Wrestling Championships.

Career 

In 2020, he also won one of the bronze medals in the 70 kg event at the Individual Wrestling World Cup held in Belgrade, Serbia.

In 2022, he won one of the bronze medals in his event at the Yasar Dogu Tournament held in Istanbul, Turkey. He competed in the 74kg event at the 2022 World Wrestling Championships held in Belgrade, Serbia.

Achievements

References

External links 
 

Living people
Year of birth missing (living people)
Place of birth missing (living people)
Kyrgyzstani male sport wrestlers
Asian Wrestling Championships medalists
21st-century Kyrgyzstani people